The Ride in the Sun (German: Der Ritt in die Sonne) is a 1926 German silent film directed by Georg Jacoby and starring Livio Pavanelli, Paul Heidemann and Hugo Werner-Kahle.

The film's sets were designed by art director Walter Reimann.

Cast
Livio Pavanelli as Fritz Jacobsen  
Paul Heidemann as Jonny Reimers  
Hugo Werner-Kahle as Hieronymi  
Hans Mierendorff as Marquis d'Orsay  
Elga Brink as Dina 
Elena Lunda as Bianca Bell 
Henry Bender as Richwald, the banker

References

External links

Films of the Weimar Republic
Films directed by Georg Jacoby
German silent feature films
German black-and-white films